Thomas Appleby may refer to:

Thomas Appleby (MP) for Southampton (UK Parliament constituency)
Thomas Appleby (composer) (c. 1488–1563), English Renaissance composer and church musician
Thomas Appleby (bishop) (died 1395), Bishop of Carlisle
T. Frank Appleby (1864–1924), U.S. Representative